The Sangre de Cristo Formation is a geologic formation in Colorado and New Mexico. It preserves fossils dating back to the late Pennsylvanian to early Permian.

Description

The formation is divided into an informal lower member and an upper Crestone Conglomerate Member. These are arranged into fining upwards cycles.

The formation is exposed in the Sangre de Cristo Mountains in both southern Colorado and northern New Mexico. However, the exposures in the southeastern Sangre de Cristo Mountains were deposited in a distinct basin (the Rowe-Mora basin) rather than the central Colorado basin, lack the marine beds found in Colorado, and should probably be assigned instead to the Abo Formation.

Fossils
The informal lower members contains sparse fossiliferous limestone beds containing crinoids, brachiopods, stromatolites, fusulinids, and conodonts.

Outcrops near the headwaters of the Pecos River include tetrapod footprints, identified as Batrachichnus, Limnopus, Ichniotherium, Tambachichnium, Dimetropus, and Dromopus. Less identifiable specimens may be Matthewichnus, Notalacerta, and Hyloidichnus. The assemblage is consistent with a late Artinskian age.

History of investigation
The formation was first described by Hills in 1899. F.A.Melton described the unit in 1925 as the Sangre de Cristo Conglomerate and defined a Crestone Conglomerate Phase (later Crestone Conglomerate Member).

Footnotes

See also

 List of fossiliferous stratigraphic units in Colorado
 Paleontology in Colorado

References
 
 
 
 
 

Carboniferous Colorado
Permian formations of New Mexico